Jamie Heath (born 25 April 1977) is an Australian cricketer. He played six first-class matches for New South Wales between 1999/00 and 2001/02.

See also
 List of New South Wales representative cricketers

References

External links
 

1977 births
Living people
Australian cricketers
New South Wales cricketers